The Alabang Tigers are a baseball team in the Baseball Philippines formed in 2007 as one of its charter members. The team was originally known as the Makati Mariners. The team moved to Muntinlupa in 2008.  They changed their name again for Series 5 in 2009

2012 roster
 Aligno, Arcel
 Baroque, Gab
 Bernardo, Adrianne
 Bernardo, Bocboc
 Cerda, Mario
 Cuyugan, Andro
 Galapon, Harry
 Kakisako, Mark
 Laurel, Carlos
 Laurel, Jay
 Laurel, Matt
 Lavado, Jemmy
 Lozada, Alden
 Mallari, Paolo
 Manzano, Anton
 Mitra, Gerald
 Munoz, Carlos
 Naguit, Paul
 Oruga, Aries
 Park, Stewart "Tuwi"
 Rosita, Melvin
 Ruiz, Laurence
 Siaotong, Bernardo

2009 roster
 Angeles, Joc Joc
 Badrina, Boysel
 Badrina, Mark Kevin
 Bernardo, Adrianne
 Borromeo, Andres
 Borromeo, Carlos
 Caspillo, Marlon
 Castro, J. B.
 Cruz, Kevin Ray
 Culubong, Kelly
 Cumlat, Jake
 Flores, Edward
 Laurel, Carlos
 Laurel, Jay
 Laurel, Matt
 Llaguno, Gian Paolo
 Mallari, Paolo
 Oruga, Aries
 Sarabia, Richie
 Siatong, B. 
 Suntay, Leslie
 Tuazon, Edward
 Vispo, Welvin

Tournament results

External links
 Baseball Philippines Official Site: Muntinlupa Mariners

Baseball teams established in 2007
Baseball Philippines
Baseball teams in the Philippines
Sports teams in Metro Manila
2007 establishments in the Philippines